William Rashleigh may refer to:

 William Rashleigh (MP for Fowey) (1777–1855), MP for Fowey 1812–18, Sheriff of Cornwall in 1818
 William Rashleigh (1817–1871), English Conservative Party politician, MP for East Cornwall 1841–47
 William Rashleigh (cricketer) (1867–1937), English cricketer who played first class cricket for Kent and Oxford University between 1885 and 1901